The 2017 Sundance Film Festival took place from January 19 to January 29, 2017. The first lineup of competition films was announced November 30, 2016.

Awards
The following awards were presented:
 Grand Jury Prize: Dramatic – I Don't Feel at Home in This World Anymore by Macon Blair
 Audience Award: Dramatic – Crown Heights by Matt Ruskin
 Directing Award: Dramatic – Eliza Hittman for Beach Rats
 Waldo Salt Screenwriting Award – David Branson Smith and Matt Spicer for Ingrid Goes West
 U.S. Dramatic Special Jury Award for Breakthrough Performance – Chanté Adams for Roxanne Roxanne
 U.S. Dramatic Special Jury Award for Breakthrough Director – Maggie Betts for Novitiate
 U.S. Dramatic Special Jury Award for Cinematography – Daniel Landin for The Yellow Birds
 Grand Jury Prize: Documentary – Dina by Dan Sickles and Antonio Santini
 Directing Award: Documentary – Peter Nicks for The Force
 U.S. Documentary Orwell Award - Icarus by Bryan Fogel
 U.S. Documentary Special Jury Award for Editing – Kim Roberts and Emiliano Battista for Unrest
 U.S. Documentary Special Jury Award for Storytelling – Yance Ford for Strong Island
 U.S. Documentary Special Jury Award for Inspirational Filmmaking – Amanda Lipitz for Step
 World Cinema Grand Jury Prize: Dramatic – The Nile Hilton Incident by Tarik Saleh
 World Cinema Directing Award: Dramatic – Francis Lee for God's Own Country
 World Cinema Dramatic Special Jury Award for Screenwriting – Kirsten Tan for Pop Aye
 World Cinema Dramatic Special Jury Award for Cinematic Visions – Geng Jun for Free and Easy
 World Cinema Dramatic Special Jury Award for Cinematography – Manuel Dacosse for Axolotl Overkill
 World Cinema Jury Prize: Documentary – Last Men in Aleppo by Feras Fayyad
 World Cinema Directing Award: Documentary – Pascale Lamche for Winnie
 World Cinema Documentary Special Jury Award for Masterful Storytelling – Catherine Bainbridge and Alfonso Maiorana for Rumble: The Indians Who Rocked the World
 World Cinema Documentary Special Jury Award for Best Cinematography – Rodrigo Trejo Villanueva for Machines
 World Cinema Documentary Special Jury Award for Editing – Ramona S. Diaz for Motherland
 Audience Award: Documentary – Chasing Coral by Jeff Orlowski
 World Cinema Audience Award: Dramatic – I Dream in Another Language by Ernesto Contreras
 World Cinema Audience Award: Documentary – Joshua: Teenager vs. Superpower by Joe Piscatella
 Best of NEXT Audience Award – Gook by Justin Chon
 Alfred P. Sloan Prize – Marjorie Prime by Michael Almereyda

Films

U.S. Dramatic Competition
 Band Aid by Zoe Lister-Jones
 Beach Rats by Eliza Hittman
 Brigsby Bear by Dave McCary
 Burning Sands by Gerard McMurray
 Crown Heights by Matt Ruskin
 Golden Exits by Alex Ross Perry
 The Hero by Brett Haley
 I Don't Feel at Home in This World Anymore by Macon Blair
 Ingrid Goes West by Matt Spicer
 Landline by Gillian Robespierre
 Novitiate by Maggie Betts
 Patti Cake$ by Geremy Jasper
 Roxanne Roxanne by Michael Larnell
 To the Bone by Marti Noxon
 Walking Out by Alex & Andrew Smith
 The Yellow Birds by Alexandre Moors

U.S. Documentary Competition
 Casting JonBenet by Kitty Green
 Chasing Coral by Jeff Orlowski
 City of Ghosts by Matthew Heineman
 Dina by Dan Sickles & Antonio Santini
 Dolores by Peter Bratt
 The Force by Pete Nicks
 ICARUS by Bryan Fogel
 The New Radical by Adam Bhala Lough
 Nobody Speak: Trials of the Free Press (originally titled NOBODY SPEAK: Hulk Hogan, Gawker and Trials of a Free Press but the title was changed after publication of the Sundance catalogue and before the world premiere of the film) by Brian Knappenberger
 Quest by Jonathan Olshefski
 STEP by Amanda Lipitz
 Strong Island by Yance Ford
 Trophy by Shaul Schwarz & Christina Clusiau
 Unrest by Jennifer Brea
 Water & Power: A California Heist by Marina Zenovich
 Whose Streets? by Sabaah Folayan & Damon Davis

Premieres
 Beatriz at Dinner by Miguel Arteta
 Before I Fall by Ry Russo-Young
 The Big Sick by Michael Showalter
 Call Me by Your Name by Luca Guadagnino
 The Discovery by Charlie McDowell
 Fun Mom Dinner by Alethea Jones
 Get Out by Jordan Peele
 The Incredible Jessica James by Jim Strouse
 The Last Word by Mark Pellington
 Manifesto by Julian Rosefeldt
 Marjorie Prime by Michael Almereyda 
 Mudbound by Dee Rees
 Newness by Drake Doremus
 The Polka King by Maya Forbes
 Rebel in the Rye by Danny Strong
 Rememory by Mark Palansky
 The Vanishing of Sidney Hall (originally titled "Sidney Hall"; changed before theatrical release) by Shawn Christensen
 Where Is Kyra? by Andrew Dosunmu
 Wilson by Craig Johnson
 Wind River by Taylor Sheridan

Next
 Columbus by Kogonada
 Dayveon by Amman Abbasi
 A Ghost Story by David Lowery
 Gook by Justin Chon
 Lemon by Janicza Bravo
 Menashe by Joshua Z Weinstein
 Person to Person by Dustin Guy Defa
 Thoroughbreds by Cory Finley

Spotlight
 Colossal by Nacho Vigalondo
 Frantz by François Ozon
 Lady Macbeth by William Oldroyd
 Raw by Julia Ducournau

Midnight
 78/52 by Alexandre O. Philippe
 Bad Day for the Cut by Chris Baugh
 Bitch by Marianna Palka
 Bushwick by Cary Murnion & Jonathan Milott
 Killing Ground by Damien Power
 Kuso by Steve
 The Little Hours by Jeff Baena
 XX by Annie Clark, Karyn Kusama, Roxanne Benjamin & Jordana Vuckovic

World Cinema Dramatic Competition
 Axolotl Overkill by Helene Hegemann
 Berlin Syndrome by Cate Shortland
 Carpinteros by José María Cabral
 Don't Swallow My Heart, Alligator Girl! by Felipe Bragança
 Family Life by Alicia Scherson & Cristián Jiménez
 Free and Easy by Geng Jun
 My Happy Family by Nana Ekvtimishvili & Simon Gross
 God's Own Country by Francis Lee
 The Nile Hilton Incident by Tarik Saleh
 Pop Aye by Kirsten Tan
 I Dream in Another Language by Ernesto Contreras
 The Wound by John Trengove

World Cinema Documentary Competition
 The Good Postman by Tonislav Hristov
 In Loco Parentis by Neasa Ní Chianáin & David Rane
 It's Not Yet Dark by Frankie Fenton
 Joshua: Teenager vs. Superpower by Joe Piscatella
 Last Men in Aleppo by Feras Fayyad
 Machines by Rahul Jain
 Motherland by Ramona Diaz
 Plastic China by Jiu-liang Wang
 RUMBLE: The Indians Who Rocked the World by Catherine Bainbridge
 Tokyo Idols by Kyoko Miyake
 WINNIE by Pascale Lamche
 The Workers Cup by Adam Sobel

New Frontier 
 18 Black Girls / Boys Ages 1-18 Who Have Arrived at the Singularity and Are Thus Spiritual Machines: $X in an Edition of $97 Quadrillion by Terence Nance
 Did You Wonder Who Fired the Gun? by Travis Wilkerson
 World Without End (No Reported Incidents) by Jem Cohen
NeuroSpeculative AfroFeminism by Carmen Aguilar y Wedge, Ashley Baccus-Clark, Ece Tankal and Nitzan Bartov

Juries
Jury members, for each program of the festival, including the Alfred P. Sloan Jury were announced on January 11, 2017.

U.S. Documentary Jury
 Diego Buñuel
 Julie Goldman
 Robert Greene
 Susan Lacy
 Larry Wilmore

U.S. Dramatic Jury
 Gael García Bernal
 Peter Dinklage
 Jody Hill
 Jacqueline Lyanga
 Jeannine Oppewall

World Documentary Jury
 Carl Spence
 Marina Stavenhagen
 Lynette Wallworth

World Dramatic Jury
 Nai An
 Sonia Braga
 Athina Rachel Tsangari

Alfred P. Sloan Jury
 Heather Berlin
 Tracy Drain
 Nell Greenfieldboyce
 Nicole Perlman
 Jennifer Phang

Short Film Jury
 Shirley Kurata
 David Lowery
 Patton Oswalt

References

External links

2017 film festivals
2017 in Utah
2017
2017 in American cinema
2017 festivals in the United States
January 2017 events in the United States